Bostronizo is a town in the Arenas de Iguña municipality of the Spanish region of Cantabria. In the year 2004 its population was 137. The church of San Román de Moroso, registered as a cultural heritage site and protected since 1931, can be found here. The church is one of the few remaining examples of Mozarabic architecture in the Cantabria region and is believed to have been constructed in the 10th century.

References
Cantabria 102 Municipios 
El Diario Montañés 

Towns in Spain
Populated places in Cantabria